Tanzhesi Town is a town located in southeastern Mentougou District, Beijing, China. It borders Dongxinfang Subdistrict, Yongding and Longquan Towns in the north, Yongding and Wangzuo Towns in the east, Qinglonghu and Hebei Towns in the south, and Fozizhuang Township in the west. Its population was 11,053 in 2020.

The name Tanzhesi refers to Tanzhe Temple that is located inside the town.

History

Administrative Divisions 
As of 2021, Tanzhesi Town was divided into 15 subdivisions, including 3 communities and 12 villages. They are listed in the table below:

See also 

 List of township-level divisions of Beijing

References 

Mentougou District
Towns in Beijing